The following is a list of notable events and releases that are expected to happen in 2016 in music in Canada.

Events
April 3 – Juno Awards of 2016
April 17 – Final concert by the influential folk-rock band Spirit of the West.
April – East Coast Music Awards
May 15 – Prism Prize presented.
May 24 – The Tragically Hip announce that lead singer Gord Downie has been diagnosed with inoperable brain cancer.
June 15 – Preliminary longlist for the 2016 Polaris Music Prize is announced.
July – SOCAN Songwriting Prize is presented.
July 14 – Shortlist for the Polaris Music Prize is announced.
July 22 – The Tragically Hip play the first date of their Man Machine Poem Tour in Victoria, British Columbia.
August 20 – The Canadian Broadcasting Corporation broadcasts The Tragically Hip's concert at the K-Rock Centre in their hometown of Kingston, which may be the band's last-ever live concert due to Gord Downie's cancer diagnosis, as a live cross-platform broadcast on CBC Television, CBC Radio One, CBC Radio 2, CBC Music and YouTube.
September 19 – Kaytranada's album 99.9% is named the winner of the Polaris Music Prize.
December 3 – 12th Canadian Folk Music Awards

Bands disbanded
Nomeansno
Spirit of the West

Albums released

A
AHI, We Made It Through the Wreckage
Altameda, Dirty Rain
Ammoye, Enter the Warrioress
Amylie, Les Éclats
Matt Andersen, Honest Man – February 26
Ancient Shapes, Ancient Shapes
Tafari Anthony, Die for You
Anvil, Anvil Is Anvil – February 26

B
Badbadnotgood, IV – July 8
Jason Bajada, Volcano – February 12
Matthew Barber and Jill Barber, The Family Album – April 1
Bobby Bazini, Summer Is Gone
Bear Mountain, BADU – September 9
Daniel Bélanger, Paloma - November 25
Art Bergmann, The Apostate – May 13
The Besnard Lakes, A Coliseum Complex Museum – January 22
Black Mountain, TBA
Jean-Michel Blais, Il
Bleu Jeans Bleu, Franchement wow
Blue Rodeo, 1000 Arms – October 28
Will Bonness, Halcyon
Brasstronaut, Brasstronaut – November 11
Alysha Brilla, Human
Jim Bryson, Somewhere We Will Find Our Place – February 12
Basia Bulat, Good Advice – February 12
The Burning Hell, Public Library – April 1

C
Brendan Canning, Home Wrecking Years – August 12
Charlotte Cardin, Big Boy
Jazz Cartier, Hotel Paranoia
Tanika Charles, Soul Run – May 10
Classified, Greatful – January 15
Leonard Cohen, You Want It Darker
Jason Collett, Song and Dance Man – February 5
Antoine Corriveau, Cette chose qui cognait au creux de sa poitrine sans vouloir s'arrêter
Crown Lands, Mantra
Lori Cullen, Sexsmith Swinghammer Songs

D
Dead Obies, Gestamtkunstwerk – March 4
Art d'Ecco, Day Fevers
Devours, Late Bloomers
Céline Dion, Encore un soir – August 26
The Dirty Nil, Higher Power – February 26
Gord Downie, Secret Path – October 18
Drake, Views – April 29

E
Earle and Coffin, Live at the Citadel House

F
The Flatliners, TBA
Luca Fogale, Safety
Fond of Tigers, Uninhabit – October 7
Fresh Snow, ONE

G
The Garrys, Warm Buds
Karina Gauvin, Divine Karina – February 12
Hannah Georgas, For Evelyn
Matthew Good, I Miss New Wave: Beautiful Midnight Revisited – December 2
Aaron Goodvin, Aaron Goodvin
Great Lake Swimmers, Swimming Away

H
Ron Hawkins, Spit Sputter and Sparkle – March 25
Tim Hecker, TBA
Angela Hewitt, Domenico Scarlatti Sonatas – February 12
The Hidden Cameras, Home On Native Land
Matt Holubowski, Solitudes
Holy Fuck, TBA

I
Ice Cream, Love, Ice Cream

J
Sammy Jackson, Take Me Back
July Talk, Touch – September 9
Junior Boys, Big Black Coat – February 5

K
Kaytranada, 99.9% – May 6
Aidan Knight, Each Other – January 22
Koriass, Love Suprême
Chantal Kreviazuk, Hard Sail – July 17 
Nicholas Krgovich, The Hills
Patrick Krief, Automanic – September 30

L
Land of Talk, TBA
k.d. lang with Neko Case and Laura Veirs, case/lang/veirs
Salomé Leclerc, Live au Treatment
Little Scream, TBA
Les Louanges, Le Mercure

M
Ria Mae, Ria Mae – June 3
Magic!, Primary Colours – July 1
Majid Jordan, Majid Jordan – February 5
Kate Maki, Head in the Sand – May 20
Dan Mangan, Unmake – June 17
Carolyn Mark, Come! Back! Special!
Shawn Mendes, Illuminate
Dylan Menzie, Adolescent Nature
Millimetrik, Fog Dreams
Ryland Moranz, Hello New Old World

N
Nap Eyes, Thought Rock Fish Scale
Sarah Neufeld, The Ridge – February 26

O
The Oot n' Oots, Songs and Tales from the Great Blue Whale
Karim Ouellet, Trente – March 11

P
Dorothea Paas, No Loose Ends
PartyNextDoor, PartyNextDoor 3 – August 12
Philémon Cimon, Psychanalysez-vous avec Philémon Cimon
Lido Pimienta, La Papessa
Plants and Animals, Waltzed in from the Rumbling – April 29
Protest The Hero, Pacific Myth – November 18

R
Radio Radio, Light the Sky – February 19
Allan Rayman, Hotel Allan
Corin Raymond, Hobo Jungle Fever Dreams
Amanda Rheaume, Holding Patterns
River Tiber, Indigo - June 24
Royal Canoe, Something Got Lost Between Here and the Orbit
Rum Ragged, Rum Ragged
Justin Rutledge, East – September 30
Serena Ryder, Utopia

S
Sam Roberts Band, Terraform – October 28
John K. Samson, Winter Wheat – October 21
SATE, RedBlack&Blue
Ségala, Plato Hess
Andy Shauf, The Party – May 20
Crystal Shawanda, Fish Out of Water
Shotgun Jimmie, Field of Trampolines
Simple Plan, Taking One for the Team – February 19
Dallas Smith, Side Effects - September 2
So Loki, V
Rae Spoon, Armour – February 19
Frederick Squire, Spooky Action at a Distance – May 27
The Strumbellas, Hope – February 5
Sussex, Parade Day
Suuns, Hold/Still

T
Tanya Tagaq, Retribution – October 21
Tasha the Amazon, Die Every Day
Tory Lanez, I Told You – August 19
The Tragically Hip, Man Machine Poem – June 17
A Tribe Called Red, We Are the Halluci Nation
Tuns, Tuns – August 26

U
Un Blonde, Good Will Come to You

V
Mathew V, Sounds
Rosie Valland, Nord-Est
Venetian Snares, Traditional Synthesizer Music – February 20
Lindy Vopnfjörð, Frozen in Time – October 28

W
Martha Wainwright, Goodnight City
Frank Walker, Nocturnal
Dawn Tyler Watson, Jawbreaker!
Weaves, Weaves
The Weeknd, Starboy – November 25
WHOOP-Szo, Citizen's Ban(ne)d Radio
Wild Rivers, Wild Rivers
Wintersleep, The Great Detachment – March 4
Woodpigeon, TROUBLE
Royal Wood, Ghost Light
Donovan Woods, Hard Settle, Ain't Troubled – February 26
Roy Woods, Nocturnal – December 23
Roy Woods, Waking at Dawn – July 1

Y
Ken Yates, Huntsville
You Say Party, You Say Party – February 12
Your Boy Tony Braxton, Adult Contempt – July 15

Z
The Zolas, Swooner – March 4

Year-End List

Deaths

References